Jillian Hunter (born 1950) is  an American author of historical romance novels. In 2015, Hunter's Forbidden to love the duke was featured in NPR's list of 'books to light your fire for Valentine's Day'. Hunter was born in Scotland to a Welsh mother and an American father. When her father became an intelligence and executive officer for the coastguard, they moved to London. She now lives in south California with her husband and three daughters. She has a Bachelor of Arts degree in French.

Awards
1995 - Romantic Times Award Nominee for Glenlyon's Bride
1997 - Romantic Times Award Nominee for Fairy Tale
1998 - Romantic Times Career Achievement Award for Historical Love and Laughter
1998 - Romantic Times Award Nominee for Daring
1999 - Romantic Times Award Nominee for Delight
2000 - Romantic Times Award Nominee for Indiscretion
2001 - Romantic Times Award Nominee for Abandon
2006 - Romantic Times Award Nominee for The Wicked Games of a Gentleman
2008 - Romantic Times Award Winner for Wicked as Sin

Bibliography

Boscastle Family
The Seduction of an English Scoundrel (Grayson, Jane), 2005
The Love Affair of an English Lord (Dominic, Chloe), 2005
The Wedding Night of an English Rogue (Heath, Julia), 2005
The Wicked Games of a Gentleman (Drake, Eloise) , 2006
The Sinful Nights of a Nobleman (Devon, Jocelyn) , 2006
The Devilish Pleasures of a Duke (Adrian, Emma), 2007
Wicked As Sin (Gabriel, Alethea), 2008
A Wicked Lord at the Wedding (Sebastien, Eleanor), 2009
The Wicked Duke Takes a Wife (Griffin, Harriet), 2009
A Duke's Temptation (Samuel, Lily), 2010
A Bride Unveiled (Kit, Violet), 2011
The Duchess Diaries (Gideon, Charlotte), 2012
The Mistress Memoirs (Colin, Kate), 2013
The Countess Confessions (Damien, Emily), 2014

Other Historicals
Heart of the Storm, 1985
Shadow of Splendor, 1987
Tiger Dance, 1991
A Deeper Magic, 1994
Glenlyon's Bride, 1995
Fairy Tale, 1997
Daring, 1998
Delight, 1998
Indiscretion, 2000
Abandon, 2001
The Husband Hunt, 2002

Anthologies
Under the Boardwalk, 1999

References

External links
 

Living people
20th-century American novelists
21st-century American novelists
American romantic fiction writers
Writers from California
American women novelists
Women romantic fiction writers
20th-century American women writers
21st-century American women writers
American people of Scottish descent
Date of birth missing (living people)
1950 births